Jonathan Igla is a writer and producer. He is currently the head writer and executive producer for the Disney+ series Hawkeye. Igla has written and produced for numerous shows, including Mad Men, Pitch, Sorry for Your Loss, Shut Eye, and Bridgerton.

Career 
Igla is most well known for his work on the AMC series Mad Men. He began as a writer in 2010 and ended up as an executive story editor. In 2015, he wrote for the Showtime series Masters of Sex. In 2016, he was a writer and co-producer for the show Pitch. The following year, he worked as a writer and producer for the second season of Shut Eye, writing two episodes. He served as a supervising producer and writer for the Facebook Watch drama series Sorry for Your Loss. In 2020, he co-produced the Netflix period drama Bridgerton. In September 2019, it was announced that he would be the head writer and showrunner for the Disney+ show Hawkeye, which is set to premiere in November 2021. In 2021, he was nominated for the Primetime Emmy Award for Outstanding Drama Series.

Filmography

Awards and nominations

References

External links 
 

Living people
Year of birth missing (living people)
Place of birth missing (living people)
Showrunners